Gudi Ewlar (also Romanized as Gūdī Owlar) is a village in Heyran Rural District, in the Central District of Astara County, Gilan Province, Iran. At the 2006 census, its population was 20, in 5 families.

Language 
Linguistic composition of the village.

References 

Populated places in Astara County

Azerbaijani settlements in Gilan Province

Talysh settlements in Gilan Province